Copper salicylate is a compound with formula Cu(C7H5O3). It is the copper salt of salicylic acid.

A copper(II) monosalicylate hydrate with formula Cu(OC6H4CO2)·H2O crystallises in the monoclinic system with unit cell a=21.362 b=6.578 c=15.941 Å and β=108.43°. The unit cell volume is 2,125.2 Å3 with Z=12 formulae per unit cell.

References

Salicylates
Copper(I) compounds